John Lee Hoerner (born September 1939) is an American businessman, CEO of Burton Group which became Arcadia Group from 1991 to November 2000.

Early life
Hoerner was born in September 1939.

Career
Hoerner was CEO of Burton Group which became Arcadia Group from 1991 to November 2000, succeeding Ralph Halpern.

He was "abruptly replaced" as chief executive at Arcadia by his "former protege", Stuart Rose.

Personal life
Hoerner and his wife Anna live on a Gloucestershire farm, with three horses, and their rescue dogs from Battersea Dogs & Cats Home.

References

1939 births
British chief executives
Living people
British Eurosceptics